The following is a list of massacres that have occurred in Nepal (numbers may be approximate):

Nepal
Massacres

massacres